Len Mitchell (29 May 1935 – 1 May 2006) was  a former Australian rules footballer who played with Richmond in the Victorian Football League (VFL).

Notes

External links 		
		
		
		
		
		
		
		
1935 births		
2006 deaths		
Australian rules footballers from Victoria (Australia)		
Richmond Football Club players